Ching Chun Li (October 27, 1912 – October 20, 2003) was a Chinese-American population geneticist and human geneticist. He was known for his research and the book An Introduction to Population Genetics.

Biography 
Ching Chun Li was born on October 27, 1912, in Taku (Chinese: 大沽口), Tianjin, China. He received his BS degree in agronomy from the University of Nanking in 1936 and a PhD in plant breeding and genetics from Cornell University in 1940. He worked as post-doctorate fellows at Columbia University and North Carolina State University from 1940 to 1941.

Li returned to China at the age of 30 and became the Professor of Genetics and Biometry at University of Nanking, his alma mater, in 1943. After World War II, he moved to Beijing for a Professorship and dean of Agronomy at Peking University in 1946, where he finished An Introduction to Population Genetics in 1948. The book was the first notable publication where a combination of the ideas of Ronald Fisher, Sewall Wright, and J. B. S. Haldane about population genetics was brought to and made understandable to the academia.

Li became persona non grata for publishing and teaching theory of genes following the 1949 establishment of a Communist government in Mainland China. The new government took the diplomatic policy of "Leaning to One Side" and adopted Soviet thought and action, including the genetic thought of the Soviet pseudoscientist Trofim Lysenko, who was standing against Mendel genetics. In 1949, Li was appointed as a professor in the Peking Agricultural University (now China Agricultural University), which was newly founded by combining Agronomy at Peking University, Agronomy at Tsingua University, and Agronomy at Huabei University. Li was propersecuted by the party branch secretary of the Peking Agricultural University, Tianyu Le, because of Li's defense of genetics. In 1950, Li fled with his family to Hong Kong, where he was trapped without  documentation of citizenship and unable to obtain a visa. Friends and colleagues, particularly Nobel laureate H. J. Muller and sixth Surgeon General of the United States T. Parran assisted Dr. Li's emigration to US. Li joined newly founded Pitt's School of Public Health (GSPH) in 1951, became the professor of biometry in 1960, and headed the biostatistics department of GSPH from 1969 to 1975. He also served as the president of the American Society of Human Genetics in 1960. After his official retirement in 1982, he still published another 25 papers and continued to go to his office every day until a few months before his death in 2003.

Bibliography

Original reports

Books 
 Li, C.C.: Introduction to Population Genetics National Peking University Press. 1948.
 Li, C.C.:  "Heredity and its Variability (by T.D. Lysenko)" Chinese translation, New China Book Co. 1949.
 Li, C.C.:  "Soviet Genetics and World Science (by Julian Huxley)" Chinese translation, Taipei, Taiwan. 1953.
 Li, C.C.: Population Genetics University of Chicago Press. 1955. 7th Impression 1972.
 Li, C.C.:  "Numbers from Experiments" Boxwood Press. 1959.
 Li, C.C.: Human Genetics Principles and Methods McGraw-Hill Book Co. 1961.
 Li, C.C.:  "Introduction to Experimental Statistics" McGraw-Hill Book Co. 1964.
 Li, C.C.:  "Path Analysis: A Primer" Boxwood Press. 1975. 2nd printing with corrections 1977. 3rd printing with corrections 1981.
 Li, C.C.:  "First Course in Population Genetics" Boxwood Press. 1976.
 Li, C.C.:  "Analysis of unbalanced data: A pre-program introduction" Cambridge University Press. 1982.

References

External links 
 Partha P. Majumder, "C. C. Li (1912–2003): his science and his spirit", in Journal of Genetics, Vol. 83, No. 1, April 2004, pp. 101–105.
 Pittsburgh Gazette obituary

Population geneticists
1912 births
2003 deaths
Cornell University alumni
University of Pittsburgh faculty
Fellows of the American Statistical Association
Members of Academia Sinica
University of Nanking alumni
Academic staff of the University of Nanking
Academic staff of Peking University
Scientists from Tianjin
Chinese Civil War refugees
Chinese emigrants to the United States
American geneticists
Chinese geneticists
Biologists from Tianjin
Educators from Tianjin
People of the Republic of China